Matthew Beard (born 25 March, 1989) is an English actor and model.

Early life
Beard was born in London. He attended King Ecgbert School in Sheffield, achieving A's in his A-Level subjects in 2007. He studied English and French literature at the University of York.
He has three sisters, Elisabeth, Emily and Charlotte.

Career
Beard made his feature film debut in the drama And When Did You Last See Your Father? in 2007. Other notable film roles include An Education (2009), The Imitation Game (2014), and The Party's Just Beginning (2018). 

Beard's television roles include Max Lieberman in the BBC series Vienna Blood (2019-2022), and Deputy Alan Lewis in the HBO series Avenue 5 (2020).

In 2015, he joined Bill Nighy and Carey Mulligan in the David Hare play Skylight on the West End and on Broadway, earning a Tony Award nomination for best featured actor in a play. He starred as Edmund Tyrone in the 2018 revival of Long Day's Journey into Night on the West End and at the Brooklyn Academy of Music.

Modelling
In 2011, he modelled for the English clothing label Burberry, and in 2015 he worked for Prada.

Filmography

Film

Television

Theatre

Awards and nominations
In 2007, he was seen as teenage Blake in And When Did You Last See Your Father?. His performance gained him rave reviews and saw him selected by Screen International as "A Star of Tomorrow" and a "Trailblazer" at the Edinburgh International Film Festival. He was also nominated for Best Newcomer at the British Independent Film Awards and Best Newcomer at the Evening Standard British Film Awards.

References

External links

Matthew Beard at BFI

1989 births
Living people
21st-century English male actors
Alumni of the University of York
English male child actors
English male film actors
English male stage actors
English male television actors
Male actors from London
People educated at King Ecgbert School